Mmabatho Mogomotsi is a South African actress and script writer. She is best known for the roles in the television serials such as; Ashes to Ashes, Hillside, Ingozi, The Wild and Yizo Yizo.

Personal life
She graduated with a degree in Dramatic Arts from the University of Witwatersrand.

She is a mother of two children.

Career
In 1999, she joined with the SABC1 drama serial Yizo Yizo and played the role "Snowey". After receiving popularity for her role, she continued to play the role until the end of third season in 2004. After that, she appeared in the second season of police procedural Zero Tolerance with the role "Sonia". In 2006, she played the role of "Botshelo" in the 'Heartlines' film The Other Woman. In the meantime, she also appeared in the medical drama serial Hillside with the role "Harriet Khanyi", where she continued to play the role until 2008. Apart from that, she appeared in the television serials such as; Dark Angels, Sorted, Homecoming, Mponeng, Crossing the Line and Izoso Connexion.

In 2008, she acted in the feature film Mafrika by playing the role of "Head Nurse Maria". In 2009, she joined with the in the second season of the SABC2 drama serial 90 Plein Street. In the meantime, she joined with two popular soap operas: as "Moipone" in Muvhango and as "Tshego Tselapedi" in Rhythm City. In 2015, she played the role of "Magistrate" in the season two of e.tv telenovela Ashes to Ashes. In the same year, she performed in the stage play The Pen and in the first ever Setswana play called Lepatata at Market Theatre and took a two-year sabbatical. Then in 2017, she joined with SABC1 drama Ingozi and played the role "Makgotso Sebotsane" in first two seasons. Meanwhile, she played the role "Candy" in Mzansi Magic drama Imposter. In 2020, she joined with another Mzansi Magic telenovela Gomora for the role "Tono".

Apart from acting, she is an Executive Director of an independent audio-visual production company titled "Afroville Media".

Filmography

References

External links
 

Living people
South African film actresses
South African television actresses
South African stage actresses
University of the Witwatersrand alumni
Year of birth missing (living people)